Fruitdale High School (FHS), is a small 1A high school in Fruitdale, Alabama. The school teaches grades  pre-K-12. The school's colors are purple and white.. The school mascot is the pirate. The school is a part of the public school system in Washington County, Alabama.

Proximity 
Fruitdale High School is located roughly 60 miles north of Mobile, Alabama, and is 5 miles east of State Line, Mississippi.

School pictures

References

External links

 Fruitdale High School Website

Public high schools in Alabama
Schools in Washington County, Alabama